In taxonomy, the Methanococcaceae are a family of the Methanococcales. These organisms produce methane from formate or through the reduction of carbon dioxide with hydrogen. They live in marshes and other coastal areas. Members of the genus Methanothermococcus have been found in deep-sea hydrothermal vents.

Phylogeny
The currently accepted taxonomy is based on the List of Prokaryotic names with Standing in Nomenclature (LPSN)  and National Center for Biotechnology Information (NCBI).

See also
 List of Archaea genera

References

Further reading

Scientific journals

Scientific books

Scientific databases

External links

Archaea taxonomic families
Euryarchaeota